National Lampoon The Best of #4 was an American humor book that was first published in 1972. The book was a "special issue" of National Lampoon magazine, so it was sold on newsstands, however it was put out in addition to the regular issues of the magazine.

The book is a "best-of", an anthology, a compilation of pieces that had already been published in the magazine, pieces that had been created by the National Lampoon's regular contributors. It includes pieces by Brian McConnachie, Gerald Sussman, Michael O'Donoghue, Henry Beard, Tony Hendra, Ron Barrett, Gahan Wilson, Doug Kenney, Sean Kelly, Christopher Cerf, Michel Choquette, Chris Miller, M. K. Brown, Rodrigues, and Edward Gorey.

References

 Info at Mark's Very Large National Lampoon Site
 Amazon listing

Best Of 4
1972 books